The Botanic Garden of Osnabrück is an institution of Osnabrück University. It is located in the Westerberg area of the city in a former Muschelkalk quarry.  Muschelkalk is a shell-bearing limestone typical to Central and Western Europe.  The Botanic Garden is part of the University’s Faculty of Biology and Chemistry and was established in 1984. Main tasks of the Garden are education and research, as well as public relations.

Description 

It comprises an area of 8.4 ha, subdivided between two quarries. One quarry of 5.6 ha houses the outdoor display gardens as well as the glasshouse. The second quarry of 2.8 ha is a conservation area and home to rare plant associations typical to recently abandoned limestone quarries. The garden’s outdoor display areas show different plant communities from all over the world such as Mediterranean and alpine plants, or North American and Eurasian forests. There are also thematic collections of medical and aromatic plants and plant families (e.g. the garlic family or the heath family). In the Lowland Rainforest House more than 800 species of tropical plants provide an example for the vegetation of the Amazon basin.

Research 

Research in the Botanic Garden of Osnabrück focuses on biodiversity and the evolution of land plants. Special interest lies in the phylogeny of the genus Allium, which is in common name referred to as the onion genus. The Allium collection of the Botanic Garden comprises 230 species. Different departments, especially the Departments of Botany and Ecology, use the Botanic Garden for outdoor testing.
The Botanic Garden of Osnabrück houses the Loki Schmidt-Genbank, a seed bank for wild plant conservation founded in 2003. The Garden also coordinates the WEL-Genbank (Genbank Wildpflanzen für Ernährung und Landwirtschaft). This seed bank, focusing on the conservation of the wild relatives of economically used plants, is under construction in cooperation with the Botanic Gardens of Berlin-Dahlem, Regensburg and Karlsruhe as well as the University of Education Karlsruhe.

Education 
The collections of the Botanic Gardens are intensively used in biological education on the university level as well as on school level.  Many biologists working on Bachelor-, Master-, Diplom- and Ph.D. theses collaborate with the Botanic Garden.

Public Relations 
The Botanic Garden of Osnabrück attracts approximately 70,000 visitors a year. Entry is free. There are guided tours of the Garden on a regular basis, the so-called “Sonntagsspaziergänge”. The “Grüne Schule” offering these Sunday tours also provides a range of different thematic and seasonal tours which can be booked by interested groups.  The offers and services of the “Grüne Schule” are especially aimed at children and groups of pupils, but there is also a variety of tours for adults. In 2010 400 guided tours of the Garden took place. Since 2011 there is also a self-guided tour available which is based on GPS Points of Interest.
The Botanic Garden and its public relations are strongly supported by the about 300 members of the Friends of the Garden, organized in the “Freundeskreis des Botanischen Gartens der Universität Osnabrück e.V.”.

See also 
 List of botanical gardens in Germany

External links 

 Botanischer Garten der Universität Osnabrück

Osnabruck, Botanischer Garten der Universitat
Osnabruck, Botanischer Garten der Universitat
Buildings and structures in Osnabrück
Tourist attractions in Osnabrück